Tina Robnik (born 30 July 1991 in Celje) is a Slovenian alpine ski racer.

World Cup results

Season standings 

Standings through 8 January 2022

World Championships results

References

1991 births
Living people
Slovenian female alpine skiers
Alpine skiers at the 2018 Winter Olympics
Alpine skiers at the 2022 Winter Olympics
Olympic alpine skiers of Slovenia